Romania has a developing, upper-middle income market economy, the 46th largest in Europe by total nominal GDP and the 46th largest based on purchasing power parity. The country is a regional leader in multiple fields, such as IT and motor vehicle production.

In 2016, Romania was the 46th largest exporter of goods in the world.

In 2015, Romania's largest trading partner was Germany, followed by Italy. Romania's main exports to Germany were insulated wire, cars and vehicle parts, whereas its main German imports are cars and vehicle parts. The principal Italian imports to Romania include hides, footwear parts, pharmaceuticals, telephones, and vehicle parts. Romania's chief exports to Italy included leather footwear, cars, telephones, tobacco, men's suits, seats and iron pipes.

2.8% of the country's GDP is derived from agricultural activity. While Romania imports substantial quantities of grain, it is largely self-sufficient in other agricultural products and food stuffs. Food must be regulated for sale in the retail market, therefore Romania imports almost no food products from other countries. In 2006 Romania imported food products worth €2.4 billion, up almost 20% versus 2005, when imports were worth slightly more than €2 billion. The European Union is Romania's main trade partner in agri-food products. Romanian EU exports represent 64%, and imports from EU countries represent 54%. Other important partners are the Central European Free Trade Agreement countries, Turkey, Moldova and the United States.

Main export goods
The following is a list of the exports of Romania. Data is for 2017, in billions of United States dollars, as reported by The Observatory of Economic Complexity. Currently the top thirty exports are listed.

References

Romania
Exports